Caucalis platycarpos is a species of flowering plant in the family Apiaceae, the only member of the genus Caucalis. Common names are carrot bur parsley, small bur-parsley, and burr parsley. It is native to Europe, North Africa, and the Middle East as far east as Iran.

Leaves are highly divided into many small leaflets. Flowers are produced in an umbel of 2 to 5 flowers, each with white or pink petals. Fruit is an oblong capsule with many hooked spines on the surface.

References

Flora of Europe
Flora of North Africa
Apioideae
Monotypic Apioideae genera